Wayne L. Martin (born 16 December 1965) is an English former professional footballer who played in the Football League for Crystal Palace as a defender.

Martin was born in Basildon, UK and began his youth career with Crystal Palace signing professional terms in July 1982. His sole appearance for the club was on 11 December 1983, in a home 1–2 defeat to Carlisle United. At the end of the season Martin moved on to South African club Arcadia Shepherds.

References

External links
CPFC players at neilbrown.com
Wayne Martin at holmesdale.net

1965 births
Living people
Sportspeople from Basildon
English footballers
Association football defenders
Crystal Palace F.C. players
Arcadia Shepherds F.C. players
Expatriate soccer players in South Africa
English Football League players